Virgin Galactic Unity 22 was a sub-orbital spaceflight of the SpaceShipTwo-class VSS Unity which launched on 11 July 2021. The crew consisted of pilots David Mackay and Michael Masucci as well as passengers Sirisha Bandla, Colin Bennett, Beth Moses, and Richard Branson.

Background 
On 7 June 2021, Jeff Bezos announced that he planned to be on the first crewed flight of his company Blue Origin, which meant being aboard the first crewed flight to space (suborbital) of a private enterprise fully funded by private money with (2 possible different "record firsts" depending on whether one uses the international standard limit of space as 100 km altitude or the USA 50 mile altitude limit):
 A) in case of using the Karman line as the boundary of space, passengers (non-pilots) onboard, or 
 B) in case of using thee USAF/NASA 50 mile altitude limit for space, more than 1 passenger (i.e. non-pilot) aboard.
These two different "record firsts" are due to the fact that A) SpaceShipOne achieved the first crewed flight to space (suborbital, crossing the 100 km line) of a private enterprise fully funded by private money but with no passengers, only pilot, onboard and B) Virgin Galactic achieved the first crewed flight to space (suborbital, crossing the 50 mile line only) of a private enterprise fully funded by private money with 1 passenger onboard in addition to the pilots. In the following days, rumors began to spread that Richard Branson was filing paperwork to make a similar suborbital flight as part of his own private enterprise, beating Bezos to claim the above mentioned first achievements. Also the one first achievement Mr. Branson stole from Mr. Bezos was to be the first founder of a spaceflight company to fly his own company's vehicle to space (50 miles).

There has been debate whether Virgin Galactic, which gets close to, but does not reach, the Kármán line, would in fact be achieving such a first commercial private flight to space. The United States and NASA defines the border of space to be 80 km (50 miles) above Earth (which is approximately the minimum possible altitude a satellite on a highly elliptical Earth orbit can reach and sustain its velocity).

Despite the rivalry (dubbed the "billionaire space race"), shortly before the flight, Bezos offered well wishes to Branson. SpaceX founder and chief executive officer Elon Musk met with Branson shortly before the flight.

Crew

Flight 

At 8:40 AM MDT on 11 July 2021, Unity's mother ship VMS Eve took off carrying VSS Unity in a parasite configuration to be drop launched. During ascent a red warning light indicated a deviation from the ship's entry glide cone, but the flight was able to proceed and land successfully regardless. The persons on board experienced about four minutes of weightlessness. Unity then glided to a landing, 14 minutes and 17 seconds after release from Eve.

Due to the entry glide cone deviation and a departure from the planned route, the flight would later come under investigation by the Federal Aviation Administration. Virgin Galactic disputed the safety impact of the deviation, and noted they were cooperating with the FAA in the investigation, in a public statement. On September 2, 2021 it was publicly announced that SpaceShipTwo would be grounded by FAA order until the investigation into the flight deviance was complete. Former Virgin Galactic test pilot Mark P. Stucky would publicly call out on Twitter the flight deviation and Virgin Galactic's response by saying: "The most misleading statement today was Virgin Galactic's. The facts are the pilots failed to trim to achieve the proper pitch rate, the winds were well within limits, they did nothing of substance to address the trajectory error, and entered Class A airspace without authorization." The FAA cleared SpaceShipTwo flights to resume later in September, after deciding to expand the restricted aerospace around the vehicle's flight range.

Firsts achieved
The 11 July 2021 flight was the first time more than 3 people flew suborbitally on a spaceflight and the first time more than 1 passenger (i.e. non-pilot) flew on a suborbital spaceflight, and Branson was the first founder of a spaceflight company to fly to space on his own company's craft, all the above using the USAF/NASA definition of space as above 50 miles.

Notes

References

External links 

 N202VG Virgin Galactic 1 Flight tracking history log

2021 in spaceflight
SpaceShipTwo
Test spaceflights
Aviation history of the United States
Suborbital human spaceflights
2021 in New Mexico
2021 in aviation
July 2021 events in the United States
Space tourists